Digimon Battle Spirit 2 is a fighting video game released for WonderSwan Color in 2002 and Game Boy Advance in 2004. It was developed by Dimps and published by Bandai based on the fourth season of the Digimon anime, Digimon Frontier. It was originally released in Japan for the WonderSwan Color handheld in December 2002 with the title . It was later ported to the Game Boy Advance for the Western market, released in North America in September 2003, and Europe in August 2004.

Gameplay
This is a battle game between Human Spirit Digimon. Unlike most fighting games, the winner is not determined by having the most health, but the most blue or red "D-Spirits", which are released whenever the player strikes an opponent. When the player has damaged the opponent enough to fill the gauge at the top, the character's Beast Spirit is activated whenever they attack, allowing them to temporarily digivolve to a higher level, and attack with greater force. Also, yellow diamonds are released during Beast Spirit attacks, and filling the diamond gauge enables the player to momentarily warp digivolve to Ancient Level and fire a powerful attack, before returning to normal (this depletes the diamond gauge to zero). Once all of the Human Spirit Digimon are defeated, the player must then defeat Cherubimon. Cherubimon's name is Kerpymon in this game.

There is also a mini-game, where Digimon are used like marbles, and are fired at other Digimon on the board to knock them out of the arena.

Plot
The plot echoes that of Digimon Frontier: Several children receive messages on their cell phones asking them if they want their lives to change. Some answer yes, some answer no. Five who answer yes are summoned to the Digital World where they receive the ability to become Digimon and fight to end Cherubimon's reign of terror.

Characters
(Eng/Jp)
 Agunimon/Agnimon
 Lobomon/Wolfmon
 Fairymon/Kazemon
 Beetlemon/Blitzmon
 Kumamon/Chuckmon
 Aldamon/Ardhamon/ExAgunimon (Agunimon sprite)
 Beowolfmon/Beowulfmon/ExLobomon (Lobomon sprite)
 Löwemon

Reception

Digimon Battle Spirit 2 received "mixed or average reviews" according to the review aggregator Metacritic.

References

2002 video games
Battle_Spirit_2
Dimps games
Game Boy Advance games
Platform fighters
Video games developed in Japan
WonderSwan Color games
Multiplayer and single-player video games